This is a partial list of unnumbered minor planets for principal provisional designations assigned during 1–15 October 2004. Since this period yielded a high number of provisional discoveries, it is further split into several standalone pages. , a total of 326 bodies remain unnumbered for this period. Objects for this year are listed on the following pages: A–B · C · D–E · F · G–H · J–O · P–Q · Ri · Rii · Riii · S · Ti · Tii · Tiii · Tiv · U–V · W–X and Y. Also see previous and next year.

T 

|- id="2004 TF200" bgcolor=#E9E9E9
| 1 ||  || MBA-M || 18.74 || data-sort-value="0.75" | 750 m || multiple || 2004–2021 || 09 Sep 2021 || 43 || align=left | Disc.: Spacewatch || 
|- id="2004 TP200" bgcolor=#E9E9E9
| 0 ||  || MBA-M || 17.38 || 1.4 km || multiple || 2004–2021 || 21 Nov 2021 || 167 || align=left | Disc.: Spacewatch || 
|- id="2004 TX200" bgcolor=#fefefe
| 0 ||  || MBA-I || 18.59 || data-sort-value="0.57" | 570 m || multiple || 2004–2021 || 04 Aug 2021 || 58 || align=left | Disc.: Spacewatch || 
|- id="2004 TD201" bgcolor=#fefefe
| 1 ||  || MBA-I || 18.9 || data-sort-value="0.49" | 490 m || multiple || 2004–2018 || 16 Sep 2018 || 32 || align=left | Disc.: SpacewatchAlt.: 2011 TB1 || 
|- id="2004 TJ201" bgcolor=#d6d6d6
| 0 ||  || MBA-O || 16.8 || 2.4 km || multiple || 2004–2021 || 09 Jan 2021 || 103 || align=left | Disc.: SpacewatchAlt.: 2010 BM135 || 
|- id="2004 TO201" bgcolor=#d6d6d6
| 1 ||  || MBA-O || 17.3 || 1.9 km || multiple || 2004–2021 || 07 Jan 2021 || 78 || align=left | Disc.: Spacewatch || 
|- id="2004 TS201" bgcolor=#E9E9E9
| 0 ||  || MBA-M || 17.66 || 1.2 km || multiple || 2004–2021 || 28 Nov 2021 || 168 || align=left | Disc.: Spacewatch || 
|- id="2004 TG202" bgcolor=#d6d6d6
| 0 ||  || MBA-O || 17.12 || 2.1 km || multiple || 2004–2021 || 29 Nov 2021 || 62 || align=left | Disc.: Spacewatch || 
|- id="2004 TH202" bgcolor=#fefefe
| 0 ||  || MBA-I || 17.8 || data-sort-value="0.82" | 820 m || multiple || 2004–2020 || 22 Mar 2020 || 102 || align=left | Disc.: Spacewatch || 
|- id="2004 TY203" bgcolor=#fefefe
| 0 ||  || MBA-I || 18.5 || data-sort-value="0.59" | 590 m || multiple || 2002–2020 || 02 Feb 2020 || 52 || align=left | Disc.: Spacewatch || 
|- id="2004 TW207" bgcolor=#E9E9E9
| E ||  || MBA-M || 18.3 || 1.2 km || single || 7 days || 14 Oct 2004 || 9 || align=left | Disc.: LPL/Spacewatch II || 
|- id="2004 TA208" bgcolor=#E9E9E9
| 0 ||  || MBA-M || 17.96 || 1.1 km || multiple || 2004–2022 || 25 Jan 2022 || 85 || align=left | Disc.: Spacewatch || 
|- id="2004 TE208" bgcolor=#d6d6d6
| 0 ||  || MBA-O || 16.6 || 2.7 km || multiple || 2004–2020 || 17 Dec 2020 || 105 || align=left | Disc.: Spacewatch || 
|- id="2004 TQ208" bgcolor=#E9E9E9
| 0 ||  || MBA-M || 17.1 || 2.1 km || multiple || 2004–2020 || 22 Mar 2020 || 43 || align=left | Disc.: Spacewatch || 
|- id="2004 TT208" bgcolor=#E9E9E9
| – ||  || MBA-M || 19.1 || data-sort-value="0.45" | 450 m || single || 3 days || 11 Oct 2004 || 12 || align=left | Disc.: Spacewatch || 
|- id="2004 TY208" bgcolor=#fefefe
| 0 ||  || MBA-I || 19.1 || data-sort-value="0.45" | 450 m || multiple || 2004–2019 || 27 Oct 2019 || 49 || align=left | Disc.: Spacewatch || 
|- id="2004 TA209" bgcolor=#E9E9E9
| 1 ||  || MBA-M || 18.89 || data-sort-value="0.70" | 700 m || multiple || 2004–2021 || 31 Oct 2021 || 42 || align=left | Disc.: Spacewatch || 
|- id="2004 TD209" bgcolor=#E9E9E9
| 3 ||  || MBA-M || 18.0 || 1.4 km || multiple || 2004–2018 || 15 Oct 2018 || 29 || align=left | Disc.: Spacewatch || 
|- id="2004 TE209" bgcolor=#d6d6d6
| 0 ||  || MBA-O || 17.1 || 2.1 km || multiple || 2004–2020 || 06 Oct 2020 || 78 || align=left | Disc.: Spacewatch || 
|- id="2004 TF209" bgcolor=#E9E9E9
| 0 ||  || MBA-M || 17.48 || data-sort-value="0.95" | 950 m || multiple || 2004–2021 || 21 Dec 2021 || 67 || align=left | Disc.: Spacewatch || 
|- id="2004 TV209" bgcolor=#d6d6d6
| 0 ||  || MBA-O || 16.79 || 2.4 km || multiple || 2004–2021 || 27 Nov 2021 || 72 || align=left | Disc.: SpacewatchAdded on 5 November 2021 || 
|- id="2004 TB210" bgcolor=#E9E9E9
| – ||  || MBA-M || 18.0 || 1.1 km || single || 4 days || 12 Oct 2004 || 10 || align=left | Disc.: Spacewatch || 
|- id="2004 TK210" bgcolor=#d6d6d6
| 0 ||  || MBA-O || 16.4 || 2.9 km || multiple || 2004–2021 || 12 Jan 2021 || 142 || align=left | Disc.: SpacewatchAlt.: 2017 CN9 || 
|- id="2004 TM210" bgcolor=#E9E9E9
| 0 ||  || MBA-M || 18.23 || 1.3 km || multiple || 2004–2018 || 10 Nov 2018 || 36 || align=left | Disc.: SpacewatchAdded on 21 August 2021 || 
|- id="2004 TT210" bgcolor=#E9E9E9
| 0 ||  || MBA-M || 18.67 || data-sort-value="0.55" | 550 m || multiple || 2004–2022 || 25 Jan 2022 || 36 || align=left | Disc.: SpacewatchAdded on 17 June 2021Alt.: 2014 EU189 || 
|- id="2004 TB211" bgcolor=#d6d6d6
| 0 ||  || MBA-O || 17.3 || 1.9 km || multiple || 2004–2020 || 20 Oct 2020 || 55 || align=left | Disc.: Spacewatch || 
|- id="2004 TL211" bgcolor=#fefefe
| 2 ||  || MBA-I || 18.8 || data-sort-value="0.52" | 520 m || multiple || 2004–2019 || 17 Dec 2019 || 31 || align=left | Disc.: SpacewatchAlt.: 2015 VC16 || 
|- id="2004 TP211" bgcolor=#fefefe
| 0 ||  || MBA-I || 18.00 || data-sort-value="0.75" | 750 m || multiple || 2004–2021 || 17 Apr 2021 || 106 || align=left | Disc.: SpacewatchAlt.: 2012 XL153 || 
|- id="2004 TU211" bgcolor=#fefefe
| 0 ||  || MBA-I || 18.3 || data-sort-value="0.65" | 650 m || multiple || 2004–2019 || 23 Sep 2019 || 68 || align=left | Disc.: SpacewatchAlt.: 2015 PV63 || 
|- id="2004 TM212" bgcolor=#fefefe
| 0 ||  || MBA-I || 18.84 || data-sort-value="0.51" | 510 m || multiple || 2004–2021 || 07 Nov 2021 || 103 || align=left | Disc.: SpacewatchAlt.: 2014 OK381 || 
|- id="2004 TS212" bgcolor=#E9E9E9
| 0 ||  || MBA-M || 17.4 || 1.8 km || multiple || 2002–2020 || 02 Feb 2020 || 66 || align=left | Disc.: Spacewatch || 
|- id="2004 TS213" bgcolor=#E9E9E9
| E ||  || MBA-M || 19.8 || data-sort-value="0.33" | 330 m || single || 2 days || 11 Oct 2004 || 15 || align=left | Disc.: Spacewatch || 
|- id="2004 TT213" bgcolor=#d6d6d6
| 0 ||  || MBA-O || 17.0 || 2.2 km || multiple || 2004–2021 || 07 Jan 2021 || 76 || align=left | Disc.: Spacewatch || 
|- id="2004 TY213" bgcolor=#d6d6d6
| 0 ||  || MBA-O || 17.58 || 1.7 km || multiple || 2004–2021 || 08 May 2021 || 79 || align=left | Disc.: LPL/Spacewatch IIAdded on 22 July 2020Alt.: 2006 CN2 || 
|- id="2004 TH214" bgcolor=#E9E9E9
| 0 ||  || MBA-M || 17.62 || 1.7 km || multiple || 2004–2021 || 18 Jun 2021 || 52 || align=left | Disc.: SpacewatchAlt.: 2017 PG5 || 
|- id="2004 TO214" bgcolor=#d6d6d6
| 0 ||  || MBA-O || 17.3 || 1.9 km || multiple || 2004–2020 || 10 Nov 2020 || 31 || align=left | Disc.: LPL/Spacewatch II || 
|- id="2004 TP214" bgcolor=#E9E9E9
| 0 ||  || MBA-M || 17.81 || 1.2 km || multiple || 2004–2021 || 04 Oct 2021 || 96 || align=left | Disc.: LPL/Spacewatch II || 
|- id="2004 TQ214" bgcolor=#E9E9E9
| – ||  || MBA-M || 19.3 || data-sort-value="0.77" | 770 m || single || 2 days || 11 Oct 2004 || 9 || align=left | Disc.: LPL/Spacewatch II || 
|- id="2004 TR214" bgcolor=#E9E9E9
| – ||  || MBA-M || 19.5 || data-sort-value="0.70" | 700 m || single || 2 days || 11 Oct 2004 || 9 || align=left | Disc.: LPL/Spacewatch II || 
|- id="2004 TB215" bgcolor=#E9E9E9
| 1 ||  || MBA-M || 18.1 || data-sort-value="0.71" | 710 m || multiple || 2004–2021 || 08 Jan 2021 || 78 || align=left | Disc.: LPL/Spacewatch IIAlt.: 2012 UX167 || 
|- id="2004 TJ215" bgcolor=#E9E9E9
| 0 ||  || MBA-M || 17.8 || 1.2 km || multiple || 2004–2019 || 13 Jan 2019 || 41 || align=left | Disc.: SpacewatchAlt.: 2017 ON29 || 
|- id="2004 TL215" bgcolor=#fefefe
| E ||  || MBA-I || 19.4 || data-sort-value="0.39" | 390 m || single || 5 days || 15 Oct 2004 || 9 || align=left | Disc.: Spacewatch || 
|- id="2004 TE216" bgcolor=#fefefe
| 0 ||  || MBA-I || 18.0 || data-sort-value="0.75" | 750 m || multiple || 2000–2020 || 16 Mar 2020 || 96 || align=left | Disc.: Molėtai Obs. || 
|- id="2004 TD217" bgcolor=#d6d6d6
| 0 ||  || MBA-O || 16.9 || 2.3 km || multiple || 2004–2019 || 03 Oct 2019 || 54 || align=left | Disc.: SpacewatchAlt.: 2014 SH325 || 
|- id="2004 TE217" bgcolor=#E9E9E9
| 0 ||  || MBA-M || 17.40 || 1.8 km || multiple || 2004–2021 || 15 Apr 2021 || 85 || align=left | Disc.: Spacewatch || 
|- id="2004 TH217" bgcolor=#fefefe
| 0 ||  || MBA-I || 19.01 || data-sort-value="0.47" | 470 m || multiple || 2004–2022 || 05 Jan 2022 || 79 || align=left | Disc.: SpacewatchAdded on 5 November 2021 || 
|- id="2004 TL217" bgcolor=#E9E9E9
| 2 ||  || MBA-M || 18.20 || data-sort-value="0.68" | 680 m || multiple || 2004–2022 || 06 Jan 2022 || 28 || align=left | Disc.: SpacewatchAdded on 24 December 2021 || 
|- id="2004 TV217" bgcolor=#fefefe
| 0 ||  || MBA-I || 18.45 || data-sort-value="0.61" | 610 m || multiple || 2004–2021 || 07 Apr 2021 || 64 || align=left | Disc.: SpacewatchAlt.: 2011 OM11 || 
|- id="2004 TX217" bgcolor=#fefefe
| 0 ||  || MBA-I || 18.3 || data-sort-value="0.65" | 650 m || multiple || 2004–2019 || 04 Dec 2019 || 48 || align=left | Disc.: Spacewatch || 
|- id="2004 TY217" bgcolor=#fefefe
| 2 ||  || MBA-I || 19.2 || data-sort-value="0.43" | 430 m || multiple || 2004–2021 || 30 Jun 2021 || 34 || align=left | Disc.: Spacewatch || 
|- id="2004 TJ218" bgcolor=#d6d6d6
| 0 ||  || MBA-O || 17.3 || 1.9 km || multiple || 2004–2020 || 20 Oct 2020 || 48 || align=left | Disc.: SpacewatchAdded on 19 October 2020 || 
|- id="2004 TM218" bgcolor=#fefefe
| 0 ||  || MBA-I || 18.6 || data-sort-value="0.57" | 570 m || multiple || 2004–2019 || 19 Nov 2019 || 56 || align=left | Disc.: SpacewatchAlt.: 2015 OD32 || 
|- id="2004 TQ219" bgcolor=#fefefe
| 1 ||  || MBA-I || 18.7 || data-sort-value="0.54" | 540 m || multiple || 2004–2019 || 03 Dec 2019 || 58 || align=left | Disc.: Spacewatch || 
|- id="2004 TR219" bgcolor=#d6d6d6
| 0 ||  || MBA-O || 16.53 || 2.8 km || multiple || 2004–2022 || 25 Jan 2022 || 119 || align=left | Disc.: Spacewatch || 
|- id="2004 TT219" bgcolor=#fefefe
| 0 ||  || MBA-I || 18.6 || data-sort-value="0.57" | 570 m || multiple || 2004–2019 || 19 Dec 2019 || 43 || align=left | Disc.: Spacewatch || 
|- id="2004 TQ220" bgcolor=#E9E9E9
| 0 ||  || MBA-M || 17.04 || 1.6 km || multiple || 2004–2021 || 27 Nov 2021 || 126 || align=left | Disc.: LPL/Spacewatch IIAlt.: 2015 FO159 || 
|- id="2004 TA222" bgcolor=#FA8072
| 0 ||  || MCA || 18.1 || data-sort-value="0.71" | 710 m || multiple || 2000–2021 || 07 Jun 2021 || 108 || align=left | Disc.: LINEAR || 
|- id="2004 TM222" bgcolor=#fefefe
| 0 ||  || MBA-I || 17.59 || data-sort-value="0.90" | 900 m || multiple || 2004–2021 || 01 Nov 2021 || 220 || align=left | Disc.: LINEARAlt.: 2011 YR2, 2016 AD93 || 
|- id="2004 TO223" bgcolor=#E9E9E9
| 0 ||  || MBA-M || 18.33 || data-sort-value="0.91" | 910 m || multiple || 2000–2021 || 03 Aug 2021 || 50 || align=left | Disc.: SpacewatchAdded on 19 October 2020 || 
|- id="2004 TP223" bgcolor=#E9E9E9
| 0 ||  || MBA-M || 18.29 || data-sort-value="0.65" | 650 m || multiple || 2004–2021 || 09 Dec 2021 || 36 || align=left | Disc.: Spacewatch || 
|- id="2004 TY223" bgcolor=#fefefe
| 0 ||  || MBA-I || 18.85 || data-sort-value="0.50" | 500 m || multiple || 2004–2022 || 25 Jan 2022 || 83 || align=left | Disc.: SpacewatchAlt.: 2013 HE99, 2014 WX465 || 
|- id="2004 TZ223" bgcolor=#E9E9E9
| 0 ||  || MBA-M || 17.00 || 1.7 km || multiple || 2004–2021 || 30 Oct 2021 || 164 || align=left | Disc.: SpacewatchAlt.: 2008 RE53 || 
|- id="2004 TD224" bgcolor=#d6d6d6
| 2 ||  || MBA-O || 17.4 || 1.8 km || multiple || 2004–2016 || 09 Oct 2016 || 31 || align=left | Disc.: Spacewatch || 
|- id="2004 TH224" bgcolor=#E9E9E9
| 0 ||  || MBA-M || 17.96 || 1.1 km || multiple || 2004–2021 || 24 Oct 2021 || 71 || align=left | Disc.: Spacewatch || 
|- id="2004 TS224" bgcolor=#d6d6d6
| 0 ||  || MBA-O || 17.19 || 2.0 km || multiple || 1993–2021 || 29 Nov 2021 || 97 || align=left | Disc.: Spacewatch || 
|- id="2004 TX224" bgcolor=#E9E9E9
| 0 ||  || MBA-M || 17.50 || data-sort-value="0.94" | 940 m || multiple || 2004–2021 || 13 Dec 2021 || 67 || align=left | Disc.: Spacewatch || 
|- id="2004 TA225" bgcolor=#fefefe
| 0 ||  || MBA-I || 18.3 || data-sort-value="0.65" | 650 m || multiple || 2004–2019 || 01 Nov 2019 || 84 || align=left | Disc.: SpacewatchAlt.: 2015 TP182 || 
|- id="2004 TG225" bgcolor=#E9E9E9
| – ||  || MBA-M || 18.8 || data-sort-value="0.52" | 520 m || single || 26 days || 03 Nov 2004 || 13 || align=left | Disc.: Spacewatch || 
|- id="2004 TO225" bgcolor=#E9E9E9
| 0 ||  || MBA-M || 18.0 || data-sort-value="0.75" | 750 m || multiple || 2000–2019 || 06 Apr 2019 || 28 || align=left | Disc.: Spacewatch || 
|- id="2004 TR225" bgcolor=#fefefe
| 0 ||  || MBA-I || 18.3 || data-sort-value="0.65" | 650 m || multiple || 2001–2020 || 15 Dec 2020 || 63 || align=left | Disc.: Spacewatch || 
|- id="2004 TS225" bgcolor=#d6d6d6
| 0 ||  || MBA-O || 17.1 || 2.1 km || multiple || 2004–2020 || 05 Nov 2020 || 74 || align=left | Disc.: Spacewatch || 
|- id="2004 TD226" bgcolor=#d6d6d6
| 0 ||  || MBA-O || 17.4 || 1.8 km || multiple || 2004–2020 || 17 Nov 2020 || 89 || align=left | Disc.: SpacewatchAlt.: 2015 TD93 || 
|- id="2004 TJ226" bgcolor=#E9E9E9
| 0 ||  || MBA-M || 17.7 || 1.6 km || multiple || 2004–2018 || 15 Oct 2018 || 52 || align=left | Disc.: SpacewatchAdded on 22 July 2020Alt.: 2017 KV23 || 
|- id="2004 TU226" bgcolor=#fefefe
| 0 ||  || HUN || 18.5 || data-sort-value="0.59" | 590 m || multiple || 2003–2020 || 16 Oct 2020 || 88 || align=left | Disc.: SpacewatchAlt.: 2015 VR42 || 
|- id="2004 TV226" bgcolor=#d6d6d6
| 0 ||  || MBA-O || 16.17 || 3.2 km || multiple || 2004–2021 || 30 Nov 2021 || 248 || align=left | Disc.: Spacewatch || 
|- id="2004 TC227" bgcolor=#E9E9E9
| 0 ||  || MBA-M || 17.8 || 1.5 km || multiple || 2004–2017 || 29 Jul 2017 || 20 || align=left | Disc.: SpacewatchAdded on 22 July 2020 || 
|- id="2004 TD227" bgcolor=#d6d6d6
| 2 ||  || MBA-O || 17.1 || 2.1 km || multiple || 2004–2021 || 24 Nov 2021 || 71 || align=left | Disc.: SpacewatchAdded on 24 December 2021 || 
|- id="2004 TN227" bgcolor=#E9E9E9
| 0 ||  || MBA-M || 17.57 || 1.3 km || multiple || 2004–2021 || 03 Dec 2021 || 152 || align=left | Disc.: Spacewatch || 
|- id="2004 TW227" bgcolor=#fefefe
| 1 ||  || MBA-I || 18.9 || data-sort-value="0.49" | 490 m || multiple || 2004–2019 || 24 Nov 2019 || 45 || align=left | Disc.: Spacewatch || 
|- id="2004 TX227" bgcolor=#fefefe
| 1 ||  || MBA-I || 19.4 || data-sort-value="0.39" | 390 m || multiple || 2004–2020 || 16 Sep 2020 || 55 || align=left | Disc.: Spacewatch || 
|- id="2004 TD228" bgcolor=#fefefe
| 0 ||  || MBA-I || 18.0 || data-sort-value="0.75" | 750 m || multiple || 2004–2021 || 16 Jan 2021 || 53 || align=left | Disc.: SpacewatchAlt.: 2006 CJ74 || 
|- id="2004 TH228" bgcolor=#E9E9E9
| – ||  || MBA-M || 18.5 || 1.1 km || single || 22 days || 14 Oct 2004 || 12 || align=left | Disc.: Spacewatch || 
|- id="2004 TT228" bgcolor=#E9E9E9
| 3 ||  || MBA-M || 17.6 || 1.3 km || multiple || 2004–2021 || 08 Dec 2021 || 72 || align=left | Disc.: SpacewatchAdded on 24 December 2021 || 
|- id="2004 TA229" bgcolor=#E9E9E9
| 0 ||  || MBA-M || 18.50 || data-sort-value="0.84" | 840 m || multiple || 2004–2021 || 10 Aug 2021 || 33 || align=left | Disc.: Spacewatch || 
|- id="2004 TB229" bgcolor=#fefefe
| 3 ||  || MBA-I || 19.5 || data-sort-value="0.37" | 370 m || multiple || 2004–2018 || 15 Sep 2018 || 37 || align=left | Disc.: Spacewatch || 
|- id="2004 TD229" bgcolor=#d6d6d6
| 2 ||  || MBA-O || 17.8 || 1.5 km || multiple || 2004–2019 || 05 Aug 2019 || 48 || align=left | Disc.: SpacewatchAlt.: 2009 SG302, 2014 QG190 || 
|- id="2004 TG229" bgcolor=#fefefe
| 1 ||  || MBA-I || 18.7 || data-sort-value="0.54" | 540 m || multiple || 2004–2017 || 29 Sep 2017 || 64 || align=left | Disc.: SpacewatchAlt.: 2014 WH87 || 
|- id="2004 TL229" bgcolor=#fefefe
| 0 ||  || MBA-I || 18.62 || data-sort-value="0.56" | 560 m || multiple || 2002–2021 || 05 Nov 2021 || 91 || align=left | Disc.: Spacewatch || 
|- id="2004 TN229" bgcolor=#d6d6d6
| 0 ||  || MBA-O || 17.3 || 1.9 km || multiple || 2004–2020 || 12 Dec 2020 || 75 || align=left | Disc.: SpacewatchAlt.: 2009 QV76 || 
|- id="2004 TR229" bgcolor=#fefefe
| 0 ||  || HUN || 19.27 || data-sort-value="0.42" | 420 m || multiple || 2004–2020 || 11 Dec 2020 || 56 || align=left | Disc.: Spacewatch || 
|- id="2004 TU229" bgcolor=#d6d6d6
| 0 ||  || MBA-O || 17.7 || 1.6 km || multiple || 2004–2020 || 14 Nov 2020 || 60 || align=left | Disc.: Spacewatch || 
|- id="2004 TV229" bgcolor=#d6d6d6
| E ||  || MBA-O || 18.0 || 1.4 km || single || 6 days || 14 Oct 2004 || 9 || align=left | Disc.: Spacewatch || 
|- id="2004 TX229" bgcolor=#E9E9E9
| 3 ||  || MBA-M || 19.1 || data-sort-value="0.45" | 450 m || multiple || 2000–2008 || 04 Sep 2008 || 19 || align=left | Disc.: Kitt Peak Obs.Alt.: 2000 WR178 || 
|- id="2004 TY229" bgcolor=#d6d6d6
| 2 ||  || MBA-O || 17.2 || 2.0 km || multiple || 2004–2020 || 20 Oct 2020 || 49 || align=left | Disc.: SpacewatchAdded on 19 October 2020 || 
|- id="2004 TO230" bgcolor=#fefefe
| 0 ||  || MBA-I || 18.45 || data-sort-value="0.61" | 610 m || multiple || 2004–2021 || 09 Nov 2021 || 122 || align=left | Disc.: Spacewatch || 
|- id="2004 TS230" bgcolor=#E9E9E9
| – ||  || MBA-M || 18.2 || 1.3 km || single || 13 days || 21 Oct 2004 || 12 || align=left | Disc.: LONEOS || 
|- id="2004 TU230" bgcolor=#d6d6d6
| 0 ||  || MBA-O || 17.22 || 2.0 km || multiple || 2004–2021 || 30 Nov 2021 || 76 || align=left | Disc.: Spacewatch || 
|- id="2004 TV230" bgcolor=#E9E9E9
| 1 ||  || MBA-M || 18.26 || data-sort-value="0.94" | 940 m || multiple || 2004–2021 || 24 Nov 2021 || 35 || align=left | Disc.: SpacewatchAdded on 24 December 2021 || 
|- id="2004 TA231" bgcolor=#fefefe
| 0 ||  || MBA-I || 18.5 || data-sort-value="0.59" | 590 m || multiple || 2004–2018 || 13 Nov 2018 || 37 || align=left | Disc.: SpacewatchAdded on 22 July 2020 || 
|- id="2004 TE231" bgcolor=#fefefe
| 1 ||  || MBA-I || 18.6 || data-sort-value="0.57" | 570 m || multiple || 2004–2015 || 03 Dec 2015 || 34 || align=left | Disc.: SpacewatchAlt.: 2015 TY232 || 
|- id="2004 TL231" bgcolor=#E9E9E9
| 3 ||  || MBA-M || 18.2 || 1.3 km || multiple || 1995–2013 || 27 Nov 2013 || 25 || align=left | Disc.: SpacewatchAdded on 5 November 2021 || 
|- id="2004 TT231" bgcolor=#fefefe
| 3 ||  || MBA-I || 19.1 || data-sort-value="0.45" | 450 m || multiple || 2004–2019 || 22 Oct 2019 || 29 || align=left | Disc.: Spacewatch || 
|- id="2004 TR232" bgcolor=#E9E9E9
| 1 ||  || MBA-M || 17.8 || data-sort-value="0.82" | 820 m || multiple || 2004–2020 || 09 Sep 2020 || 58 || align=left | Disc.: SpacewatchAlt.: 2015 HG215 || 
|- id="2004 TY232" bgcolor=#fefefe
| 1 ||  || MBA-I || 18.3 || data-sort-value="0.65" | 650 m || multiple || 2004–2019 || 26 Oct 2019 || 64 || align=left | Disc.: SpacewatchAlt.: 2015 TE162 || 
|- id="2004 TE233" bgcolor=#E9E9E9
| 0 ||  || MBA-M || 17.55 || 1.7 km || multiple || 2004–2021 || 13 Apr 2021 || 73 || align=left | Disc.: SpacewatchAlt.: 2013 TJ68 || 
|- id="2004 TV233" bgcolor=#E9E9E9
| 0 ||  || MBA-M || 17.82 || 1.1 km || multiple || 2004–2021 || 09 Sep 2021 || 56 || align=left | Disc.: SpacewatchAdded on 30 September 2021 || 
|- id="2004 TC234" bgcolor=#fefefe
| 0 ||  || MBA-I || 18.43 || data-sort-value="0.61" | 610 m || multiple || 2004–2021 || 08 May 2021 || 31 || align=left | Disc.: SpacewatchAdded on 17 June 2021 || 
|- id="2004 TV234" bgcolor=#E9E9E9
| 0 ||  || MBA-M || 17.85 || 1.1 km || multiple || 2004–2021 || 11 Sep 2021 || 61 || align=left | Disc.: Spacewatch || 
|- id="2004 TX234" bgcolor=#d6d6d6
| 0 ||  || MBA-O || 16.70 || 2.5 km || multiple || 2004–2022 || 25 Jan 2022 || 106 || align=left | Disc.: SpacewatchAlt.: 2014 SX4 || 
|- id="2004 TY234" bgcolor=#d6d6d6
| 0 ||  || MBA-O || 17.1 || 2.1 km || multiple || 2004–2020 || 14 Nov 2020 || 59 || align=left | Disc.: SpacewatchAdded on 22 July 2020 || 
|- id="2004 TZ234" bgcolor=#fefefe
| 0 ||  || MBA-I || 18.7 || data-sort-value="0.54" | 540 m || multiple || 2004–2019 || 03 Oct 2019 || 45 || align=left | Disc.: SpacewatchAlt.: 2015 PN80 || 
|- id="2004 TC235" bgcolor=#E9E9E9
| 0 ||  || MBA-M || 17.8 || 1.5 km || multiple || 2004–2020 || 23 Jan 2020 || 37 || align=left | Disc.: Spacewatch || 
|- id="2004 TE235" bgcolor=#fefefe
| 1 ||  || MBA-I || 18.9 || data-sort-value="0.49" | 490 m || multiple || 1991–2020 || 05 Nov 2020 || 86 || align=left | Disc.: SpacewatchAlt.: 2007 PW7 || 
|- id="2004 TJ235" bgcolor=#d6d6d6
| 0 ||  || MBA-O || 16.7 || 2.5 km || multiple || 2004–2021 || 06 Jan 2021 || 84 || align=left | Disc.: SpacewatchAdded on 22 July 2020Alt.: 2014 QM6 || 
|- id="2004 TK235" bgcolor=#d6d6d6
| 0 ||  || MBA-O || 17.3 || 1.9 km || multiple || 1994–2019 || 26 Nov 2019 || 44 || align=left | Disc.: SpacewatchAlt.: 2014 WG75 || 
|- id="2004 TO235" bgcolor=#E9E9E9
| 0 ||  || MBA-M || 16.6 || 2.7 km || multiple || 2004–2020 || 24 Mar 2020 || 120 || align=left | Disc.: Spacewatch || 
|- id="2004 TP235" bgcolor=#d6d6d6
| 0 ||  || MBA-O || 17.16 || 2.1 km || multiple || 2004–2022 || 25 Jan 2022 || 93 || align=left | Disc.: SpacewatchAlt.: 2009 UF40, 2015 XB204 || 
|- id="2004 TX235" bgcolor=#d6d6d6
| 0 ||  || MBA-O || 16.69 || 2.6 km || multiple || 2004–2022 || 22 Jan 2022 || 106 || align=left | Disc.: Spacewatch || 
|- id="2004 TZ235" bgcolor=#d6d6d6
| 0 ||  || MBA-O || 17.1 || 2.1 km || multiple || 2004–2020 || 20 Oct 2020 || 74 || align=left | Disc.: Spacewatch || 
|- id="2004 TR236" bgcolor=#d6d6d6
| 0 ||  || MBA-O || 17.09 || 2.1 km || multiple || 2004–2021 || 24 Nov 2021 || 42 || align=left | Disc.: SpacewatchAdded on 5 November 2021 || 
|- id="2004 TY236" bgcolor=#d6d6d6
| 0 ||  || MBA-O || 16.47 || 2.8 km || multiple || 2004–2022 || 22 Jan 2022 || 150 || align=left | Disc.: LINEAR || 
|- id="2004 TZ236" bgcolor=#fefefe
| 0 ||  || MBA-I || 17.9 || data-sort-value="0.78" | 780 m || multiple || 2004–2020 || 26 Jan 2020 || 70 || align=left | Disc.: LINEAR || 
|- id="2004 TK237" bgcolor=#E9E9E9
| 1 ||  || MBA-M || 17.9 || data-sort-value="0.78" | 780 m || multiple || 1996–2020 || 17 Oct 2020 || 61 || align=left | Disc.: SpacewatchAdded on 17 January 2021Alt.: 2008 UE161 || 
|- id="2004 TO237" bgcolor=#E9E9E9
| 0 ||  || MBA-M || 18.59 || data-sort-value="0.80" | 800 m || multiple || 2004–2022 || 07 Jan 2022 || 39 || align=left | Disc.: SpacewatchAdded on 24 December 2021 || 
|- id="2004 TP237" bgcolor=#fefefe
| 0 ||  || MBA-I || 18.3 || data-sort-value="0.65" | 650 m || multiple || 2002–2019 || 22 Oct 2019 || 61 || align=left | Disc.: SpacewatchAlt.: 2015 MQ68 || 
|- id="2004 TW237" bgcolor=#d6d6d6
| 2 ||  || MBA-O || 17.4 || 1.8 km || multiple || 2004–2020 || 10 Nov 2020 || 54 || align=left | Disc.: Spacewatch || 
|- id="2004 TX237" bgcolor=#E9E9E9
| 0 ||  || MBA-M || 17.91 || 1.1 km || multiple || 2004–2021 || 25 Nov 2021 || 70 || align=left | Disc.: Spacewatch || 
|- id="2004 TE238" bgcolor=#d6d6d6
| 1 ||  || MBA-O || 17.5 || 1.8 km || multiple || 2004–2019 || 17 Dec 2019 || 50 || align=left | Disc.: Spacewatch || 
|- id="2004 TJ238" bgcolor=#E9E9E9
| – ||  || MBA-M || 17.9 || data-sort-value="0.78" | 780 m || single || 6 days || 15 Oct 2004 || 10 || align=left | Disc.: Spacewatch || 
|- id="2004 TA239" bgcolor=#fefefe
| 3 ||  || MBA-I || 18.3 || data-sort-value="0.65" | 650 m || multiple || 2004–2020 || 22 Mar 2020 || 22 || align=left | Disc.: SpacewatchAdded on 9 March 2021 || 
|- id="2004 TN239" bgcolor=#fefefe
| 0 ||  || MBA-I || 18.4 || data-sort-value="0.62" | 620 m || multiple || 2004–2018 || 12 Jul 2018 || 52 || align=left | Disc.: SpacewatchAlt.: 2015 XJ354 || 
|- id="2004 TU239" bgcolor=#d6d6d6
| 0 ||  || MBA-O || 17.00 || 2.2 km || multiple || 2004–2022 || 22 Jan 2022 || 70 || align=left | Disc.: SpacewatchAlt.: 2017 BQ117 || 
|- id="2004 TA240" bgcolor=#fefefe
| 0 ||  || MBA-I || 18.0 || data-sort-value="0.75" | 750 m || multiple || 2004–2020 || 31 Jan 2020 || 105 || align=left | Disc.: SpacewatchAlt.: 2006 JX78, 2015 TH82 || 
|- id="2004 TB241" bgcolor=#E9E9E9
| 1 ||  || MBA-M || 17.2 || 1.5 km || multiple || 2004–2020 || 19 Apr 2020 || 107 || align=left | Disc.: LINEARAlt.: 2017 SD89 || 
|- id="2004 TC242" bgcolor=#d6d6d6
| 0 ||  || MBA-O || 15.93 || 3.6 km || multiple || 2004–2021 || 29 Nov 2021 || 175 || align=left | Disc.: Spacewatch || 
|- id="2004 TD242" bgcolor=#fefefe
| 0 ||  || MBA-I || 18.36 || data-sort-value="0.63" | 630 m || multiple || 2004–2021 || 21 Dec 2021 || 89 || align=left | Disc.: SpacewatchAlt.: 2021 RC101 || 
|- id="2004 TX243" bgcolor=#E9E9E9
| 0 ||  || MBA-M || 18.05 || 1.0 km || multiple || 2004–2021 || 01 Nov 2021 || 62 || align=left | Disc.: SpacewatchAlt.: 2017 WH10 || 
|- id="2004 TE244" bgcolor=#fefefe
| 0 ||  || MBA-I || 18.36 || data-sort-value="0.63" | 630 m || multiple || 2004–2021 || 14 Apr 2021 || 59 || align=left | Disc.: LONEOSAlt.: 2011 OT17 || 
|- id="2004 TL244" bgcolor=#E9E9E9
| 0 ||  || MBA-M || 17.5 || data-sort-value="0.94" | 940 m || multiple || 2003–2020 || 21 Oct 2020 || 154 || align=left | Disc.: SpacewatchAlt.: 2011 GJ1 || 
|- id="2004 TM244" bgcolor=#E9E9E9
| 0 ||  || MBA-M || 18.07 || data-sort-value="0.72" | 720 m || multiple || 1992–2022 || 25 Jan 2022 || 91 || align=left | Disc.: SpacewatchAlt.: 2008 SN222, 2012 QZ34 || 
|- id="2004 TQ244" bgcolor=#fefefe
| 0 ||  || MBA-I || 18.5 || data-sort-value="0.59" | 590 m || multiple || 2004–2021 || 20 Mar 2021 || 33 || align=left | Disc.: Spacewatch || 
|- id="2004 TR244" bgcolor=#E9E9E9
| 0 ||  || MBA-M || 17.42 || 1.8 km || multiple || 2004–2021 || 10 Apr 2021 || 53 || align=left | Disc.: SpacewatchAlt.: 2013 RN89 || 
|- id="2004 TS244" bgcolor=#E9E9E9
| 0 ||  || MBA-M || 17.88 || 1.1 km || multiple || 2004–2021 || 10 Aug 2021 || 48 || align=left | Disc.: SpacewatchAlt.: 2015 BG409 || 
|- id="2004 TV244" bgcolor=#E9E9E9
| 1 ||  || MBA-M || 17.9 || data-sort-value="0.78" | 780 m || multiple || 2004–2020 || 08 Oct 2020 || 110 || align=left | Disc.: SpacewatchAlt.: 2012 SU47, 2014 FP9 || 
|- id="2004 TW244" bgcolor=#E9E9E9
| 0 ||  || MBA-M || 17.3 || 1.0 km || multiple || 2000–2020 || 07 Oct 2020 || 56 || align=left | Disc.: Spacewatch || 
|- id="2004 TC245" bgcolor=#d6d6d6
| 0 ||  || MBA-O || 16.84 || 2.4 km || multiple || 2003–2021 || 30 Nov 2021 || 101 || align=left | Disc.: Spacewatch || 
|- id="2004 TN246" bgcolor=#fefefe
| 0 ||  || MBA-I || 18.3 || data-sort-value="0.65" | 650 m || multiple || 2004–2020 || 15 Oct 2020 || 115 || align=left | Disc.: Spacewatch || 
|- id="2004 TS246" bgcolor=#E9E9E9
| 0 ||  || MBA-M || 18.19 || data-sort-value="0.68" | 680 m || multiple || 2004–2021 || 11 Nov 2021 || 31 || align=left | Disc.: SpacewatchAdded on 13 September 2020 || 
|- id="2004 TV246" bgcolor=#E9E9E9
| 0 ||  || MBA-M || 18.31 || data-sort-value="0.92" | 920 m || multiple || 2000–2021 || 03 Dec 2021 || 43 || align=left | Disc.: SpacewatchAdded on 24 December 2021 || 
|- id="2004 TE248" bgcolor=#fefefe
| 1 ||  || MBA-I || 19.87 || data-sort-value="0.32" | 320 m || multiple || 2004–2022 || 25 Jan 2022 || 33 || align=left | Disc.: SpacewatchAlt.: 2014 TX80, 2014 UN181 || 
|- id="2004 TJ248" bgcolor=#E9E9E9
| 0 ||  || MBA-M || 18.22 || data-sort-value="0.95" | 950 m || multiple || 2004–2021 || 04 Aug 2021 || 51 || align=left | Disc.: SpacewatchAlt.: 2006 DQ193 || 
|- id="2004 TK248" bgcolor=#E9E9E9
| 0 ||  || MBA-M || 18.43 || data-sort-value="0.87" | 870 m || multiple || 2004–2021 || 04 Aug 2021 || 34 || align=left | Disc.: Spacewatch || 
|- id="2004 TV248" bgcolor=#E9E9E9
| 0 ||  || MBA-M || 17.85 || data-sort-value="0.80" | 800 m || multiple || 2004–2021 || 03 Dec 2021 || 125 || align=left | Disc.: Spacewatch || 
|- id="2004 TC249" bgcolor=#fefefe
| 0 ||  || MBA-I || 18.3 || data-sort-value="0.65" | 650 m || multiple || 2004–2019 || 02 Nov 2019 || 48 || align=left | Disc.: Spacewatch || 
|- id="2004 TR249" bgcolor=#fefefe
| 0 ||  || MBA-I || 18.4 || data-sort-value="0.62" | 620 m || multiple || 2004–2020 || 17 Nov 2020 || 141 || align=left | Disc.: Spacewatch || 
|- id="2004 TC250" bgcolor=#fefefe
| – ||  || MBA-I || 18.6 || data-sort-value="0.57" | 570 m || single || 8 days || 15 Oct 2004 || 10 || align=left | Disc.: LPL/Spacewatch II || 
|- id="2004 TD250" bgcolor=#fefefe
| 3 ||  || MBA-I || 19.4 || data-sort-value="0.39" | 390 m || multiple || 2004–2018 || 12 Nov 2018 || 28 || align=left | Disc.: LPL/Spacewatch IIAdded on 17 June 2021 || 
|- id="2004 TE250" bgcolor=#fefefe
| 0 ||  || MBA-I || 18.14 || data-sort-value="0.70" | 700 m || multiple || 2004–2021 || 15 Apr 2021 || 50 || align=left | Disc.: LPL/Spacewatch II || 
|- id="2004 TC251" bgcolor=#d6d6d6
| 0 ||  || MBA-O || 16.97 || 2.2 km || multiple || 2004–2021 || 30 Nov 2021 || 77 || align=left | Disc.: SpacewatchAdded on 17 January 2021 || 
|- id="2004 TJ251" bgcolor=#E9E9E9
| 0 ||  || MBA-M || 17.0 || 2.2 km || multiple || 2004–2020 || 22 Mar 2020 || 97 || align=left | Disc.: Spacewatch || 
|- id="2004 TU251" bgcolor=#fefefe
| 4 ||  || MBA-I || 18.8 || data-sort-value="0.52" | 520 m || multiple || 2004–2018 || 05 Oct 2018 || 25 || align=left | Disc.: SpacewatchAdded on 19 October 2020 || 
|- id="2004 TV251" bgcolor=#E9E9E9
| 0 ||  || MBA-M || 18.02 || 1.0 km || multiple || 2004–2021 || 24 Nov 2021 || 82 || align=left | Disc.: Spacewatch || 
|- id="2004 TB252" bgcolor=#fefefe
| 0 ||  || MBA-I || 18.1 || data-sort-value="0.71" | 710 m || multiple || 1999–2019 || 28 Nov 2019 || 52 || align=left | Disc.: Spacewatch || 
|- id="2004 TE252" bgcolor=#fefefe
| 5 ||  || MBA-I || 19.0 || data-sort-value="0.47" | 470 m || multiple || 2004–2015 || 12 Nov 2015 || 18 || align=left | Disc.: SpacewatchAdded on 19 October 2020 || 
|- id="2004 TF252" bgcolor=#d6d6d6
| 0 ||  || MBA-O || 17.37 || 1.9 km || multiple || 2004–2022 || 23 Jan 2022 || 34 || align=left | Disc.: SpacewatchAdded on 17 January 2021 || 
|- id="2004 TN252" bgcolor=#d6d6d6
| 0 ||  || MBA-O || 17.07 || 2.1 km || multiple || 2004–2021 || 02 Dec 2021 || 113 || align=left | Disc.: SpacewatchAlt.: 2015 SC5 || 
|- id="2004 TS252" bgcolor=#E9E9E9
| 1 ||  || MBA-M || 18.09 || 1.0 km || multiple || 2004–2021 || 23 Nov 2021 || 44 || align=left | Disc.: SpacewatchAdded on 5 November 2021Alt.: 2021 ST27 || 
|- id="2004 TW252" bgcolor=#fefefe
| 0 ||  || MBA-I || 18.72 || data-sort-value="0.54" | 540 m || multiple || 2004–2022 || 25 Jan 2022 || 52 || align=left | Disc.: SpacewatchAlt.: 2014 WC121 || 
|- id="2004 TY252" bgcolor=#fefefe
| 2 ||  || MBA-I || 19.2 || data-sort-value="0.43" | 430 m || multiple || 2004–2021 || 05 Feb 2021 || 23 || align=left | Disc.: SpacewatchAdded on 21 August 2021Alt.: 2008 UB296 || 
|- id="2004 TZ252" bgcolor=#fefefe
| 0 ||  || MBA-I || 18.10 || data-sort-value="0.71" | 710 m || multiple || 1993–2021 || 15 Apr 2021 || 78 || align=left | Disc.: Spacewatch || 
|- id="2004 TA253" bgcolor=#E9E9E9
| 0 ||  || MBA-M || 18.16 || data-sort-value="0.98" | 980 m || multiple || 2004–2021 || 04 Oct 2021 || 95 || align=left | Disc.: Spacewatch || 
|- id="2004 TE253" bgcolor=#FA8072
| 3 ||  || MCA || 19.6 || data-sort-value="0.36" | 360 m || multiple || 2004–2021 || 04 Oct 2021 || 45 || align=left | Disc.: SpacewatchAdded on 5 November 2021Alt.: 2021 PL44 || 
|- id="2004 TV253" bgcolor=#E9E9E9
| 0 ||  || MBA-M || 17.87 || 1.5 km || multiple || 2004–2021 || 11 Jun 2021 || 31 || align=left | Disc.: SpacewatchAdded on 5 November 2021 || 
|- id="2004 TA254" bgcolor=#fefefe
| 0 ||  || MBA-I || 18.5 || data-sort-value="0.59" | 590 m || multiple || 2004–2019 || 27 Oct 2019 || 93 || align=left | Disc.: SpacewatchAlt.: 2015 PR174 || 
|- id="2004 TF254" bgcolor=#d6d6d6
| 0 ||  || MBA-O || 16.9 || 2.3 km || multiple || 1997–2020 || 05 Nov 2020 || 90 || align=left | Disc.: Spacewatch || 
|- id="2004 TL254" bgcolor=#fefefe
| 0 ||  || MBA-I || 18.2 || data-sort-value="0.68" | 680 m || multiple || 2003–2021 || 16 Jan 2021 || 45 || align=left | Disc.: SpacewatchAlt.: 2004 TV255 || 
|- id="2004 TO254" bgcolor=#fefefe
| 2 ||  || MBA-I || 19.0 || data-sort-value="0.47" | 470 m || multiple || 2004–2019 || 28 Dec 2019 || 25 || align=left | Disc.: Spacewatch || 
|- id="2004 TQ254" bgcolor=#d6d6d6
| 0 ||  || MBA-O || 16.22 || 3.2 km || multiple || 2004–2021 || 15 Mar 2021 || 46 || align=left | Disc.: Spacewatch || 
|- id="2004 TB255" bgcolor=#d6d6d6
| 0 ||  || MBA-O || 16.55 || 2.7 km || multiple || 2004–2021 || 30 Nov 2021 || 108 || align=left | Disc.: Spacewatch || 
|- id="2004 TD255" bgcolor=#E9E9E9
| 1 ||  || MBA-M || 18.0 || data-sort-value="0.75" | 750 m || multiple || 2004–2020 || 10 Nov 2020 || 37 || align=left | Disc.: Spacewatch || 
|- id="2004 TK255" bgcolor=#E9E9E9
| 0 ||  || MBA-M || 18.12 || 1.0 km || multiple || 2004–2021 || 19 Nov 2021 || 84 || align=left | Disc.: Spacewatch || 
|- id="2004 TP255" bgcolor=#fefefe
| 0 ||  || MBA-I || 18.4 || data-sort-value="0.62" | 620 m || multiple || 2004–2019 || 19 Dec 2019 || 91 || align=left | Disc.: SpacewatchAlt.: 2015 PY246 || 
|- id="2004 TY255" bgcolor=#fefefe
| E ||  || MBA-I || 18.4 || data-sort-value="0.62" | 620 m || single || 4 days || 13 Oct 2004 || 10 || align=left | Disc.: LONEOS || 
|- id="2004 TZ255" bgcolor=#E9E9E9
| 0 ||  || MBA-M || 17.75 || 1.2 km || multiple || 2004–2022 || 25 Jan 2022 || 153 || align=left | Disc.: LONEOS || 
|- id="2004 TD256" bgcolor=#fefefe
| 1 ||  || MBA-I || 17.8 || data-sort-value="0.82" | 820 m || multiple || 2004–2017 || 20 Jan 2017 || 32 || align=left | Disc.: Spacewatch || 
|- id="2004 TE256" bgcolor=#d6d6d6
| 0 ||  || MBA-O || 17.67 || 1.6 km || multiple || 2004–2021 || 30 Nov 2021 || 69 || align=left | Disc.: SpacewatchAdded on 5 November 2021 || 
|- id="2004 TH256" bgcolor=#fefefe
| 3 ||  || MBA-I || 18.6 || data-sort-value="0.57" | 570 m || multiple || 2004–2015 || 08 Nov 2015 || 20 || align=left | Disc.: SpacewatchAdded on 21 August 2021 || 
|- id="2004 TJ256" bgcolor=#E9E9E9
| 3 ||  || MBA-M || 17.6 || 1.7 km || multiple || 2004–2018 || 17 Nov 2018 || 27 || align=left | Disc.: Spacewatch || 
|- id="2004 TT256" bgcolor=#fefefe
| 0 ||  || MBA-I || 18.2 || data-sort-value="0.68" | 680 m || multiple || 2004–2019 || 19 Nov 2019 || 59 || align=left | Disc.: Spacewatch || 
|- id="2004 TU256" bgcolor=#E9E9E9
| 0 ||  || MBA-M || 17.41 || data-sort-value="0.98" | 980 m || multiple || 2004–2022 || 24 Jan 2022 || 92 || align=left | Disc.: SpacewatchAlt.: 2010 KW155, 2015 KJ100 || 
|- id="2004 TV256" bgcolor=#FA8072
| 0 ||  || MCA || 19.2 || data-sort-value="0.43" | 430 m || multiple || 2004–2020 || 20 Oct 2020 || 93 || align=left | Disc.: Spacewatch || 
|- id="2004 TW256" bgcolor=#E9E9E9
| 1 ||  || MBA-M || 18.43 || data-sort-value="0.61" | 610 m || multiple || 2004–2022 || 24 Jan 2022 || 32 || align=left | Disc.: SpacewatchAdded on 17 January 2021 || 
|- id="2004 TE257" bgcolor=#E9E9E9
| 0 ||  || MBA-M || 17.26 || 2.0 km || multiple || 1999–2021 || 11 May 2021 || 99 || align=left | Disc.: SpacewatchAlt.: 2013 SK1, 2016 ES175 || 
|- id="2004 TG257" bgcolor=#fefefe
| 0 ||  || MBA-I || 17.63 || data-sort-value="0.89" | 890 m || multiple || 2003–2021 || 29 Oct 2021 || 209 || align=left | Disc.: SpacewatchAlt.: 2011 SN171 || 
|- id="2004 TK257" bgcolor=#E9E9E9
| 0 ||  || MBA-M || 17.3 || 1.9 km || multiple || 1995–2020 || 26 Apr 2020 || 67 || align=left | Disc.: SpacewatchAlt.: 1995 UY81, 2006 CD55, 2017 OZ4 || 
|- id="2004 TN257" bgcolor=#d6d6d6
| 0 ||  || MBA-O || 17.5 || 1.8 km || multiple || 2004–2020 || 06 Dec 2020 || 50 || align=left | Disc.: Spacewatch || 
|- id="2004 TQ257" bgcolor=#E9E9E9
| 0 ||  || MBA-M || 17.30 || 1.9 km || multiple || 2004–2021 || 04 May 2021 || 52 || align=left | Disc.: SpacewatchAdded on 22 July 2020Alt.: 2018 VS39 || 
|- id="2004 TS257" bgcolor=#E9E9E9
| 0 ||  || MBA-M || 17.66 || data-sort-value="0.87" | 870 m || multiple || 2004–2022 || 24 Jan 2022 || 47 || align=left | Disc.: Spacewatch || 
|- id="2004 TV257" bgcolor=#fefefe
| 1 ||  || MBA-I || 19.71 || data-sort-value="0.34" | 340 m || multiple || 2004–2021 || 13 Jul 2021 || 30 || align=left | Disc.: SpacewatchAdded on 19 October 2020 || 
|- id="2004 TX257" bgcolor=#E9E9E9
| 0 ||  || MBA-M || 18.23 || data-sort-value="0.95" | 950 m || multiple || 2004–2021 || 07 Nov 2021 || 64 || align=left | Disc.: Spacewatch || 
|- id="2004 TT258" bgcolor=#d6d6d6
| 1 ||  || MBA-O || 18.26 || 1.2 km || multiple || 2004–2021 || 20 Mar 2021 || 30 || align=left | Disc.: LPL/Spacewatch IIAdded on 11 May 2021 || 
|- id="2004 TV258" bgcolor=#d6d6d6
| 1 ||  || MBA-O || 18.0 || 1.4 km || multiple || 2004–2020 || 11 Oct 2020 || 40 || align=left | Disc.: Spacewatch || 
|- id="2004 TB259" bgcolor=#d6d6d6
| 0 ||  || MBA-O || 16.89 || 2.3 km || multiple || 2004–2022 || 01 Jan 2022 || 125 || align=left | Disc.: SpacewatchAlt.: 2015 VX11 || 
|- id="2004 TR259" bgcolor=#E9E9E9
| 0 ||  || MBA-M || 17.49 || 1.3 km || multiple || 2004–2021 || 03 Dec 2021 || 143 || align=left | Disc.: Spacewatch || 
|- id="2004 TS259" bgcolor=#d6d6d6
| 0 ||  || MBA-O || 17.7 || 1.6 km || multiple || 2004–2020 || 16 Oct 2020 || 42 || align=left | Disc.: SpacewatchAdded on 17 January 2021Alt.: 2013 HV151 || 
|- id="2004 TV259" bgcolor=#d6d6d6
| 0 ||  || MBA-O || 16.7 || 2.5 km || multiple || 2004–2021 || 06 Jan 2021 || 96 || align=left | Disc.: SpacewatchAlt.: 2015 XU255 || 
|- id="2004 TW259" bgcolor=#d6d6d6
| 0 ||  || MBA-O || 16.7 || 2.5 km || multiple || 2004–2020 || 14 Oct 2020 || 62 || align=left | Disc.: Spacewatch || 
|- id="2004 TZ259" bgcolor=#d6d6d6
| 0 ||  || MBA-O || 16.7 || 2.5 km || multiple || 1994–2021 || 24 Jan 2021 || 175 || align=left | Disc.: SpacewatchAlt.: 2010 BT33 || 
|- id="2004 TB260" bgcolor=#d6d6d6
| 0 ||  || MBA-O || 16.7 || 2.5 km || multiple || 2004–2021 || 30 Oct 2021 || 66 || align=left | Disc.: SpacewatchAdded on 29 January 2022 || 
|- id="2004 TE260" bgcolor=#fefefe
| 0 ||  || MBA-I || 17.83 || data-sort-value="0.81" | 810 m || multiple || 2004–2021 || 03 May 2021 || 136 || align=left | Disc.: LINEARAlt.: 2013 AL103 || 
|- id="2004 TG260" bgcolor=#fefefe
| 0 ||  || MBA-I || 18.4 || data-sort-value="0.62" | 620 m || multiple || 2004–2020 || 16 Mar 2020 || 79 || align=left | Disc.: SpacewatchAlt.: 2006 JL76 || 
|- id="2004 TH260" bgcolor=#d6d6d6
| 1 ||  || MBA-O || 17.4 || 1.8 km || multiple || 2004–2020 || 15 Sep 2020 || 71 || align=left | Disc.: SpacewatchAdded on 22 July 2020 || 
|- id="2004 TL260" bgcolor=#d6d6d6
| 0 ||  || MBA-O || 17.3 || 1.9 km || multiple || 2004–2021 || 30 Oct 2021 || 36 || align=left | Disc.: SpacewatchAdded on 29 January 2022 || 
|- id="2004 TE261" bgcolor=#E9E9E9
| 2 ||  || MBA-M || 18.1 || 1.0 km || multiple || 2004–2017 || 23 Sep 2017 || 27 || align=left | Disc.: SpacewatchAdded on 17 June 2021Alt.: 2013 WH12 || 
|- id="2004 TF261" bgcolor=#E9E9E9
| 0 ||  || MBA-M || 17.3 || 1.9 km || multiple || 2004–2020 || 21 Apr 2020 || 47 || align=left | Disc.: Spacewatch || 
|- id="2004 TS261" bgcolor=#d6d6d6
| 0 ||  || MBA-O || 17.12 || 2.1 km || multiple || 2004–2021 || 29 Nov 2021 || 47 || align=left | Disc.: Spacewatch || 
|- id="2004 TZ261" bgcolor=#fefefe
| 0 ||  || MBA-I || 17.68 || data-sort-value="0.87" | 870 m || multiple || 2004–2021 || 11 May 2021 || 95 || align=left | Disc.: Spacewatch || 
|- id="2004 TA262" bgcolor=#fefefe
| 0 ||  || MBA-I || 18.7 || data-sort-value="0.54" | 540 m || multiple || 2004–2020 || 14 Aug 2020 || 63 || align=left | Disc.: Spacewatch || 
|- id="2004 TB262" bgcolor=#E9E9E9
| 2 ||  || MBA-M || 18.42 || data-sort-value="0.87" | 870 m || multiple || 2004–2021 || 09 Aug 2021 || 28 || align=left | Disc.: Spacewatch || 
|- id="2004 TE262" bgcolor=#d6d6d6
| 0 ||  || MBA-O || 16.8 || 2.4 km || multiple || 2004–2020 || 06 Dec 2020 || 112 || align=left | Disc.: Spacewatch || 
|- id="2004 TG262" bgcolor=#fefefe
| 0 ||  || MBA-I || 17.9 || data-sort-value="0.78" | 780 m || multiple || 2000–2021 || 18 Jan 2021 || 105 || align=left | Disc.: Spacewatch || 
|- id="2004 TU262" bgcolor=#E9E9E9
| 0 ||  || MBA-M || 17.61 || 1.3 km || multiple || 2004–2022 || 27 Jan 2022 || 100 || align=left | Disc.: NEATAdded on 30 September 2021 || 
|- id="2004 TV262" bgcolor=#fefefe
| 1 ||  || MBA-I || 18.7 || data-sort-value="0.54" | 540 m || multiple || 2004–2015 || 19 Nov 2015 || 28 || align=left | Disc.: SpacewatchAdded on 19 October 2020 || 
|- id="2004 TW262" bgcolor=#d6d6d6
| – ||  || MBA-O || 16.7 || 2.5 km || single || 26 days || 04 Nov 2004 || 10 || align=left | Disc.: Spacewatch || 
|- id="2004 TD263" bgcolor=#fefefe
| 0 ||  || MBA-I || 18.5 || data-sort-value="0.59" | 590 m || multiple || 2000–2019 || 31 Dec 2019 || 72 || align=left | Disc.: SpacewatchAlt.: 2015 RT104 || 
|- id="2004 TJ263" bgcolor=#E9E9E9
| 0 ||  || MBA-M || 18.49 || data-sort-value="0.60" | 600 m || multiple || 2004–2022 || 26 Jan 2022 || 44 || align=left | Disc.: Spacewatch || 
|- id="2004 TF264" bgcolor=#E9E9E9
| 0 ||  || MBA-M || 18.22 || data-sort-value="0.95" | 950 m || multiple || 2004–2021 || 09 Nov 2021 || 57 || align=left | Disc.: SpacewatchAdded on 5 November 2021 || 
|- id="2004 TV264" bgcolor=#fefefe
| 0 ||  || MBA-I || 18.5 || data-sort-value="0.59" | 590 m || multiple || 2003–2019 || 27 Nov 2019 || 92 || align=left | Disc.: SpacewatchAlt.: 2015 TJ6 || 
|- id="2004 TD265" bgcolor=#fefefe
| 2 ||  || MBA-I || 18.5 || data-sort-value="0.59" | 590 m || multiple || 2004–2020 || 25 Jan 2020 || 50 || align=left | Disc.: Spacewatch || 
|- id="2004 TY265" bgcolor=#E9E9E9
| E ||  || MBA-M || 17.6 || 1.3 km || single || 6 days || 15 Oct 2004 || 10 || align=left | Disc.: Spacewatch || 
|- id="2004 TF267" bgcolor=#E9E9E9
| 0 ||  || MBA-M || 17.82 || 1.1 km || multiple || 2004–2021 || 07 Sep 2021 || 103 || align=left | Disc.: Spacewatch || 
|- id="2004 TJ267" bgcolor=#d6d6d6
| 0 ||  || MBA-O || 17.3 || 1.9 km || multiple || 2004–2018 || 13 Aug 2018 || 59 || align=left | Disc.: SpacewatchAlt.: 2009 UJ108, 2017 HX41 || 
|- id="2004 TM267" bgcolor=#fefefe
| 0 ||  || MBA-I || 18.58 || data-sort-value="0.57" | 570 m || multiple || 2004–2021 || 12 May 2021 || 87 || align=left | Disc.: SpacewatchAlt.: 2008 YR57 || 
|- id="2004 TV267" bgcolor=#fefefe
| 0 ||  || MBA-I || 18.3 || data-sort-value="0.65" | 650 m || multiple || 2003–2019 || 27 Oct 2019 || 50 || align=left | Disc.: Spacewatch || 
|- id="2004 TX267" bgcolor=#fefefe
| 4 ||  || MBA-I || 19.4 || data-sort-value="0.39" | 390 m || multiple || 2004–2018 || 06 Oct 2018 || 25 || align=left | Disc.: Spacewatch || 
|- id="2004 TC268" bgcolor=#E9E9E9
| 0 ||  || MBA-M || 17.19 || 1.5 km || multiple || 2004–2021 || 06 Nov 2021 || 131 || align=left | Disc.: SpacewatchAlt.: 2011 EG62 || 
|- id="2004 TU268" bgcolor=#E9E9E9
| 0 ||  || MBA-M || 17.68 || 1.2 km || multiple || 2004–2021 || 09 Sep 2021 || 44 || align=left | Disc.: Spacewatch || 
|- id="2004 TY268" bgcolor=#E9E9E9
| 0 ||  || MBA-M || 18.18 || data-sort-value="0.97" | 970 m || multiple || 2004–2021 || 14 Nov 2021 || 53 || align=left | Disc.: SpacewatchAdded on 24 December 2021 || 
|- id="2004 TN269" bgcolor=#d6d6d6
| 0 ||  || MBA-O || 17.1 || 2.1 km || multiple || 2004–2021 || 11 Jan 2021 || 112 || align=left | Disc.: Spacewatch || 
|- id="2004 TQ269" bgcolor=#fefefe
| 0 ||  || MBA-I || 18.4 || data-sort-value="0.62" | 620 m || multiple || 2004–2020 || 09 Oct 2020 || 95 || align=left | Disc.: Spacewatch || 
|- id="2004 TL270" bgcolor=#E9E9E9
| 2 ||  || MBA-M || 18.1 || data-sort-value="0.71" | 710 m || multiple || 1996–2020 || 21 Oct 2020 || 83 || align=left | Disc.: SpacewatchAlt.: 2016 TL15 || 
|- id="2004 TN270" bgcolor=#fefefe
| 0 ||  || MBA-I || 18.52 || data-sort-value="0.59" | 590 m || multiple || 1998–2021 || 13 May 2021 || 41 || align=left | Disc.: SpacewatchAdded on 22 July 2020 || 
|- id="2004 TW270" bgcolor=#fefefe
| 0 ||  || MBA-I || 18.0 || data-sort-value="0.75" | 750 m || multiple || 2004–2020 || 17 Oct 2020 || 120 || align=left | Disc.: SpacewatchAlt.: 2006 EX73, 2007 RD87 || 
|- id="2004 TE271" bgcolor=#fefefe
| 0 ||  || MBA-I || 18.28 || data-sort-value="0.66" | 660 m || multiple || 2004–2021 || 14 Apr 2021 || 71 || align=left | Disc.: SpacewatchAlt.: 2015 TD254, 2015 VO109 || 
|- id="2004 TL271" bgcolor=#E9E9E9
| 1 ||  || MBA-M || 18.62 || data-sort-value="0.79" | 790 m || multiple || 2004–2021 || 20 Nov 2021 || 49 || align=left | Disc.: SpacewatchAdded on 5 November 2021 || 
|- id="2004 TP271" bgcolor=#E9E9E9
| 4 ||  || MBA-M || 18.6 || data-sort-value="0.80" | 800 m || multiple || 2004–2021 || 30 Nov 2021 || 34 || align=left | Disc.: SpacewatchAdded on 29 January 2022 || 
|- id="2004 TZ271" bgcolor=#E9E9E9
| 2 ||  || MBA-M || 17.4 || 1.8 km || multiple || 2004–2019 || 10 Jan 2019 || 61 || align=left | Disc.: Spacewatch || 
|- id="2004 TA272" bgcolor=#fefefe
| 0 ||  || MBA-I || 18.38 || data-sort-value="0.63" | 630 m || multiple || 2004–2021 || 05 Nov 2021 || 135 || align=left | Disc.: SpacewatchAlt.: 2014 OE2 || 
|- id="2004 TG272" bgcolor=#d6d6d6
| 0 ||  || MBA-O || 16.8 || 2.4 km || multiple || 2004–2020 || 16 Nov 2020 || 52 || align=left | Disc.: SpacewatchAdded on 22 July 2020 || 
|- id="2004 TC275" bgcolor=#fefefe
| 0 ||  || MBA-I || 18.1 || data-sort-value="0.71" | 710 m || multiple || 2004–2021 || 11 Jun 2021 || 84 || align=left | Disc.: SpacewatchAlt.: 2014 KQ12 || 
|- id="2004 TK275" bgcolor=#fefefe
| 0 ||  || MBA-I || 18.0 || data-sort-value="0.75" | 750 m || multiple || 2004–2019 || 30 Nov 2019 || 106 || align=left | Disc.: SpacewatchAlt.: 2015 TZ164 || 
|- id="2004 TN276" bgcolor=#FA8072
| 1 ||  || MCA || 18.5 || data-sort-value="0.59" | 590 m || multiple || 2004–2019 || 08 Jan 2019 || 92 || align=left | Disc.: Spacewatch || 
|- id="2004 TS276" bgcolor=#d6d6d6
| 0 ||  || MBA-O || 17.37 || 1.9 km || multiple || 2004–2022 || 25 Jan 2022 || 100 || align=left | Disc.: Spacewatch || 
|- id="2004 TZ278" bgcolor=#fefefe
| 0 ||  || MBA-I || 17.5 || data-sort-value="0.94" | 940 m || multiple || 2004–2021 || 24 Jan 2021 || 82 || align=left | Disc.: SpacewatchAdded on 17 January 2021Alt.: 2015 PP282 || 
|- id="2004 TB279" bgcolor=#E9E9E9
| 0 ||  || MBA-M || 18.00 || data-sort-value="0.75" | 750 m || multiple || 2004–2022 || 09 Jan 2022 || 63 || align=left | Disc.: Spacewatch || 
|- id="2004 TW279" bgcolor=#fefefe
| 0 ||  || MBA-I || 19.10 || data-sort-value="0.45" | 450 m || multiple || 2003–2019 || 03 Oct 2019 || 43 || align=left | Disc.: SpacewatchAlt.: 2015 PD93 || 
|- id="2004 TY279" bgcolor=#d6d6d6
| 0 ||  || MBA-O || 16.73 || 2.5 km || multiple || 2004–2021 || 02 Dec 2021 || 92 || align=left | Disc.: SpacewatchAlt.: 2015 TB264 || 
|- id="2004 TJ280" bgcolor=#fefefe
| 0 ||  || MBA-I || 18.2 || data-sort-value="0.68" | 680 m || multiple || 2004–2019 || 04 Nov 2019 || 83 || align=left | Disc.: Spacewatch || 
|- id="2004 TF281" bgcolor=#fefefe
| 0 ||  || MBA-I || 18.3 || data-sort-value="0.65" | 650 m || multiple || 2004–2020 || 17 Nov 2020 || 111 || align=left | Disc.: Spacewatch || 
|- id="2004 TQ281" bgcolor=#fefefe
| 3 ||  || MBA-I || 18.9 || data-sort-value="0.49" | 490 m || multiple || 2004–2015 || 04 Dec 2015 || 27 || align=left | Disc.: SpacewatchAlt.: 2015 VD36 || 
|- id="2004 TU281" bgcolor=#fefefe
| 0 ||  || MBA-I || 18.3 || data-sort-value="0.65" | 650 m || multiple || 2004–2020 || 08 Dec 2020 || 124 || align=left | Disc.: SpacewatchAlt.: 2015 AQ28 || 
|- id="2004 TW281" bgcolor=#fefefe
| 0 ||  || MBA-I || 17.59 || data-sort-value="0.90" | 900 m || multiple || 2003–2021 || 11 May 2021 || 180 || align=left | Disc.: LONEOSAlt.: 2003 HF8, 2010 EE44, 2011 SB137 || 
|- id="2004 TY281" bgcolor=#fefefe
| 0 ||  || MBA-I || 18.89 || data-sort-value="0.50" | 500 m || multiple || 2004–2021 || 15 Apr 2021 || 34 || align=left | Disc.: Spacewatch || 
|- id="2004 TE282" bgcolor=#C2E0FF
| 2 ||  || TNO || 8.3 || 122 km || multiple || 2004–2014 || 26 Sep 2014 || 24 || align=left | Disc.: Kitt Peak Obs.LoUTNOs, centaur || 
|- id="2004 TF282" bgcolor=#C2E0FF
| 0 ||  || TNO || 6.3 || 207 km || multiple || 2004–2019 || 28 Dec 2019 || 136 || align=left | Disc.: Kitt Peak Obs.LoUTNOs, SDO || 
|- id="2004 TG282" bgcolor=#E9E9E9
| 0 ||  || MBA-M || 18.03 || data-sort-value="0.74" | 740 m || multiple || 2004–2022 || 25 Jan 2022 || 50 || align=left | Disc.: NEAT || 
|- id="2004 TJ283" bgcolor=#d6d6d6
| 1 ||  || MBA-O || 16.8 || 2.4 km || multiple || 2004–2019 || 25 Oct 2019 || 97 || align=left | Disc.: SpacewatchAlt.: 2009 SP330 || 
|- id="2004 TM283" bgcolor=#E9E9E9
| 0 ||  || MBA-M || 17.2 || 1.5 km || multiple || 1991–2020 || 22 Apr 2020 || 75 || align=left | Disc.: Spacewatch || 
|- id="2004 TW283" bgcolor=#d6d6d6
| 0 ||  || MBA-O || 15.93 || 3.6 km || multiple || 2004–2021 || 11 Nov 2021 || 125 || align=left | Disc.: LONEOSAdded on 17 June 2021Alt.: 2010 OE111 || 
|- id="2004 TA284" bgcolor=#fefefe
| 3 ||  || MBA-I || 18.4 || data-sort-value="0.62" | 620 m || multiple || 2004–2019 || 03 Dec 2019 || 40 || align=left | Disc.: Spacewatch || 
|- id="2004 TP284" bgcolor=#d6d6d6
| 0 ||  || MBA-O || 16.6 || 2.7 km || multiple || 2004–2021 || 09 Nov 2021 || 57 || align=left | Disc.: SpacewatchAdded on 29 January 2022 || 
|- id="2004 TS284" bgcolor=#E9E9E9
| 0 ||  || MBA-M || 18.2 || data-sort-value="0.96" | 960 m || multiple || 2004–2021 || 30 Nov 2021 || 66 || align=left | Disc.: SpacewatchAdded on 24 December 2021 || 
|- id="2004 TX284" bgcolor=#d6d6d6
| 0 ||  || MBA-O || 17.4 || 1.8 km || multiple || 2002–2021 || 05 Jan 2021 || 55 || align=left | Disc.: SpacewatchAdded on 17 January 2021 || 
|- id="2004 TK285" bgcolor=#fefefe
| 4 ||  || MBA-I || 19.1 || data-sort-value="0.45" | 450 m || multiple || 2004–2019 || 26 Nov 2019 || 24 || align=left | Disc.: SpacewatchAdded on 30 September 2021 || 
|- id="2004 TO285" bgcolor=#d6d6d6
| 0 ||  || MBA-O || 17.48 || 1.8 km || multiple || 2004–2021 || 23 Nov 2021 || 44 || align=left | Disc.: SpacewatchAdded on 5 November 2021 || 
|- id="2004 TQ285" bgcolor=#E9E9E9
| – ||  || MBA-M || 17.4 || 1.8 km || single || 47 days || 04 Nov 2004 || 19 || align=left | Disc.: LINEAR || 
|- id="2004 TM286" bgcolor=#E9E9E9
| 0 ||  || MBA-M || 17.82 || 1.1 km || multiple || 2004–2022 || 05 Jan 2022 || 61 || align=left | Disc.: Spacewatch || 
|- id="2004 TO286" bgcolor=#d6d6d6
| 0 ||  || MBA-O || 16.77 || 2.5 km || multiple || 2004–2021 || 01 Dec 2021 || 112 || align=left | Disc.: LINEARAdded on 19 October 2020Alt.: 2015 TP321 || 
|- id="2004 TJ288" bgcolor=#E9E9E9
| 0 ||  || MBA-M || 17.7 || 1.2 km || multiple || 2004–2017 || 07 Nov 2017 || 36 || align=left | Disc.: Spacewatch  || 
|- id="2004 TO288" bgcolor=#E9E9E9
| 0 ||  || MBA-M || 17.58 || 1.3 km || multiple || 2004–2021 || 11 Oct 2021 || 101 || align=left | Disc.: Spacewatch Added on 22 July 2020 || 
|- id="2004 TR288" bgcolor=#d6d6d6
| 0 ||  || MBA-O || 17.3 || 1.9 km || multiple || 2004–2020 || 07 Dec 2020 || 89 || align=left | Disc.: Spacewatch Alt.: 2015 XJ275 || 
|- id="2004 TA289" bgcolor=#E9E9E9
| 0 ||  || MBA-M || 18.29 || data-sort-value="0.92" | 920 m || multiple || 2004–2019 || 05 Feb 2019 || 40 || align=left | Disc.: Spacewatch || 
|- id="2004 TB289" bgcolor=#d6d6d6
| 1 ||  || MBA-O || 17.4 || 1.8 km || multiple || 2004–2020 || 10 Dec 2020 || 67 || align=left | Disc.: SpacewatchAlt.: 2014 ON10 || 
|- id="2004 TJ289" bgcolor=#fefefe
| 2 ||  || MBA-I || 18.6 || data-sort-value="0.57" | 570 m || multiple || 2004–2019 || 14 Jan 2019 || 39 || align=left | Disc.: SpacewatchAlt.: 2014 TB39 || 
|- id="2004 TP289" bgcolor=#d6d6d6
| 0 ||  || MBA-O || 16.3 || 3.1 km || multiple || 2004–2020 || 17 Dec 2020 || 85 || align=left | Disc.: Spacewatch || 
|- id="2004 TQ289" bgcolor=#E9E9E9
| 0 ||  || MBA-M || 17.7 || 1.6 km || multiple || 2002–2019 || 03 Jan 2019 || 61 || align=left | Disc.: Spacewatch || 
|- id="2004 TU289" bgcolor=#E9E9E9
| 0 ||  || MBA-M || 18.10 || data-sort-value="0.71" | 710 m || multiple || 2004–2022 || 06 Jan 2022 || 49 || align=left | Disc.: SpacewatchAdded on 17 January 2021 || 
|- id="2004 TV289" bgcolor=#d6d6d6
| 0 ||  || MBA-O || 16.49 || 2.8 km || multiple || 2004–2021 || 07 Nov 2021 || 144 || align=left | Disc.: Spacewatch || 
|- id="2004 TA290" bgcolor=#E9E9E9
| 0 ||  || MBA-M || 18.47 || data-sort-value="0.85" | 850 m || multiple || 2004–2021 || 26 Nov 2021 || 36 || align=left | Disc.: SpacewatchAdded on 24 December 2021 || 
|- id="2004 TD290" bgcolor=#fefefe
| 0 ||  || MBA-I || 18.79 || data-sort-value="0.52" | 520 m || multiple || 2004–2021 || 11 Nov 2021 || 56 || align=left | Disc.: SpacewatchAdded on 9 March 2021 || 
|- id="2004 TN290" bgcolor=#fefefe
| 0 ||  || HUN || 19.63 || data-sort-value="0.35" | 350 m || multiple || 2004–2019 || 07 May 2019 || 93 || align=left | Disc.: SpacewatchAdded on 21 August 2021 || 
|- id="2004 TP290" bgcolor=#fefefe
| 2 ||  || MBA-I || 19.4 || data-sort-value="0.39" | 390 m || multiple || 2004–2018 || 08 Aug 2018 || 24 || align=left | Disc.: Spacewatch || 
|- id="2004 TT290" bgcolor=#fefefe
| 1 ||  || MBA-I || 18.2 || data-sort-value="0.68" | 680 m || multiple || 2004–2019 || 19 Dec 2019 || 52 || align=left | Disc.: SpacewatchAlt.: 2015 VL19 || 
|- id="2004 TV290" bgcolor=#d6d6d6
| 1 ||  || MBA-O || 17.5 || 1.8 km || multiple || 2004–2019 || 22 Oct 2019 || 58 || align=left | Disc.: Spacewatch || 
|- id="2004 TX290" bgcolor=#d6d6d6
| 0 ||  || MBA-O || 17.0 || 2.2 km || multiple || 2004–2021 || 18 Jan 2021 || 110 || align=left | Disc.: SpacewatchAlt.: 2005 YJ260, 2016 AS61 || 
|- id="2004 TY290" bgcolor=#fefefe
| 0 ||  || MBA-I || 18.85 || data-sort-value="0.50" | 500 m || multiple || 2004–2021 || 02 Oct 2021 || 38 || align=left | Disc.: SpacewatchAdded on 30 September 2021 || 
|- id="2004 TM291" bgcolor=#E9E9E9
| 0 ||  || MBA-M || 18.7 || data-sort-value="0.76" | 760 m || multiple || 2004–2021 || 11 Nov 2021 || 37 || align=left | Disc.: SpacewatchAdded on 29 January 2022 || 
|- id="2004 TN291" bgcolor=#d6d6d6
| 0 ||  || MBA-O || 17.5 || 1.8 km || multiple || 2004–2021 || 18 Jan 2021 || 43 || align=left | Disc.: Spacewatch || 
|- id="2004 TT291" bgcolor=#fefefe
| 1 ||  || MBA-I || 18.93 || data-sort-value="0.49" | 490 m || multiple || 2004–2021 || 02 Dec 2021 || 36 || align=left | Disc.: SpacewatchAlt.: 2014 SW114 || 
|- id="2004 TU291" bgcolor=#fefefe
| 0 ||  || MBA-I || 18.7 || data-sort-value="0.54" | 540 m || multiple || 2002–2021 || 18 Jan 2021 || 49 || align=left | Disc.: Spacewatch || 
|- id="2004 TV291" bgcolor=#E9E9E9
| 0 ||  || MBA-M || 17.7 || 1.6 km || multiple || 1995–2017 || 21 Sep 2017 || 39 || align=left | Disc.: Spacewatch || 
|- id="2004 TW291" bgcolor=#fefefe
| 4 ||  || MBA-I || 19.0 || data-sort-value="0.47" | 470 m || multiple || 2004–2019 || 04 Dec 2019 || 30 || align=left | Disc.: Spacewatch || 
|- id="2004 TZ291" bgcolor=#E9E9E9
| 0 ||  || MBA-M || 17.34 || 1.4 km || multiple || 2004–2022 || 07 Jan 2022 || 103 || align=left | Disc.: LINEAR || 
|- id="2004 TH292" bgcolor=#fefefe
| 2 ||  || MBA-I || 19.2 || data-sort-value="0.43" | 430 m || multiple || 2004–2019 || 01 Nov 2019 || 52 || align=left | Disc.: Spacewatch || 
|- id="2004 TN292" bgcolor=#fefefe
| 0 ||  || MBA-I || 18.03 || data-sort-value="0.74" | 740 m || multiple || 2004–2021 || 03 Apr 2021 || 85 || align=left | Disc.: Spacewatch || 
|- id="2004 TZ292" bgcolor=#E9E9E9
| 0 ||  || MBA-M || 16.89 || 1.8 km || multiple || 2003–2021 || 25 Nov 2021 || 209 || align=left | Disc.: Spacewatch || 
|- id="2004 TH293" bgcolor=#d6d6d6
| 0 ||  || MBA-O || 16.6 || 2.7 km || multiple || 2004–2020 || 06 Dec 2020 || 111 || align=left | Disc.: SpacewatchAlt.: 2015 TS88 || 
|- id="2004 TJ293" bgcolor=#d6d6d6
| 0 ||  || MBA-O || 16.84 || 2.4 km || multiple || 2004–2021 || 09 Nov 2021 || 84 || align=left | Disc.: SpacewatchAlt.: 2010 XS52 || 
|- id="2004 TA294" bgcolor=#fefefe
| 1 ||  || MBA-I || 18.6 || data-sort-value="0.57" | 570 m || multiple || 2004–2018 || 06 Oct 2018 || 67 || align=left | Disc.: SpacewatchAlt.: 2004 VM121, 2009 DK65 || 
|- id="2004 TG294" bgcolor=#d6d6d6
| 0 ||  || MBA-O || 16.5 || 2.8 km || multiple || 2004–2021 || 07 Jan 2021 || 105 || align=left | Disc.: Spacewatch || 
|- id="2004 TH294" bgcolor=#fefefe
| 0 ||  || MBA-I || 18.2 || data-sort-value="0.68" | 680 m || multiple || 2003–2018 || 10 Jun 2018 || 83 || align=left | Disc.: SpacewatchAlt.: 2011 OT23 || 
|- id="2004 TJ294" bgcolor=#fefefe
| 1 ||  || MBA-I || 18.2 || data-sort-value="0.68" | 680 m || multiple || 2004–2020 || 02 Feb 2020 || 38 || align=left | Disc.: Spacewatch || 
|- id="2004 TT294" bgcolor=#d6d6d6
| 0 ||  || MBA-O || 16.8 || 2.4 km || multiple || 2004–2020 || 24 Dec 2020 || 67 || align=left | Disc.: SpacewatchAlt.: 2014 UF107 || 
|- id="2004 TA295" bgcolor=#fefefe
| 0 ||  || MBA-I || 18.86 || data-sort-value="0.50" | 500 m || multiple || 2004–2021 || 28 Dec 2021 || 75 || align=left | Disc.: SpacewatchAlt.: 2014 UR99 || 
|- id="2004 TL296" bgcolor=#fefefe
| 3 ||  || MBA-I || 18.4 || data-sort-value="0.62" | 620 m || multiple || 2004–2015 || 13 Dec 2015 || 32 || align=left | Disc.: Spacewatch || 
|- id="2004 TZ296" bgcolor=#fefefe
| 0 ||  || MBA-I || 18.7 || data-sort-value="0.54" | 540 m || multiple || 2002–2020 || 27 Feb 2020 || 54 || align=left | Disc.: LPL/Spacewatch IIAlt.: 2015 YR20 || 
|- id="2004 TU297" bgcolor=#d6d6d6
| 0 ||  || MBA-O || 17.5 || 1.8 km || multiple || 2004–2021 || 12 Feb 2021 || 53 || align=left | Disc.: SpacewatchAdded on 21 August 2021 || 
|- id="2004 TV297" bgcolor=#d6d6d6
| 0 ||  || MBA-O || 17.2 || 2.0 km || multiple || 2004–2020 || 20 Oct 2020 || 75 || align=left | Disc.: Spacewatch || 
|- id="2004 TY297" bgcolor=#d6d6d6
| – ||  || MBA-O || 15.8 || 3.9 km || single || 29 days || 10 Nov 2004 || 8 || align=left | Disc.: Spacewatch || 
|- id="2004 TM298" bgcolor=#fefefe
| 0 ||  || MBA-I || 18.4 || data-sort-value="0.62" | 620 m || multiple || 2004–2019 || 28 Dec 2019 || 62 || align=left | Disc.: Spacewatch || 
|- id="2004 TO298" bgcolor=#d6d6d6
| 0 ||  || MBA-O || 16.4 || 2.9 km || multiple || 2003–2020 || 14 Nov 2020 || 120 || align=left | Disc.: LPL/Spacewatch IIAlt.: 2014 QU224 || 
|- id="2004 TP298" bgcolor=#E9E9E9
| 0 ||  || MBA-M || 17.93 || 1.1 km || multiple || 2004–2021 || 08 Sep 2021 || 86 || align=left | Disc.: LPL/Spacewatch IIAlt.: 2017 RY82 || 
|- id="2004 TV298" bgcolor=#d6d6d6
| 0 ||  || MBA-O || 17.5 || 1.8 km || multiple || 1999–2020 || 11 Nov 2020 || 38 || align=left | Disc.: Spacewatch || 
|- id="2004 TP299" bgcolor=#d6d6d6
| 0 ||  || MBA-O || 17.0 || 2.2 km || multiple || 2004–2019 || 22 Oct 2019 || 47 || align=left | Disc.: Spacewatch || 
|- id="2004 TS299" bgcolor=#d6d6d6
| 1 ||  || MBA-O || 17.5 || 1.8 km || multiple || 2004–2019 || 23 Oct 2019 || 45 || align=left | Disc.: SpacewatchAlt.: 2014 QF406 || 
|- id="2004 TZ299" bgcolor=#fefefe
| 0 ||  || MBA-I || 17.99 || data-sort-value="0.75" | 750 m || multiple || 2004–2021 || 09 Apr 2021 || 85 || align=left | Disc.: LINEAR || 
|}
back to top

References 
 

Lists of unnumbered minor planets